King of Moomba may refer to:
 King of Moomba, awarded at the Moomba festival
 "King of Moomba" (song), a single by Do-Ré-Mi